The Corruption of Mercy is the second album by English metal vocalist Sarah Jezebel Deva. Originally planned for release on 20 June 2011, it was delayed till 27 June 2011, due to artwork issues. The album features a cover track originally by Irish band The Cranberries. On the American and Canadian releases, the cover song is "Frozen" by Madonna.

Track listing

References

2011 albums
Sarah Jezebel Deva albums